Salut Casa! (or Casablanca Boom Town, for English audiences) is a 1952 "pseudo-documentary" propaganda short film about Casablanca under the French Protectorate. Directed by Jean Vidal, it was screened at the 1953 Cannes Film Festival. The film presents Casablanca to French audiences as a miracle of the French : a modern city in North Africa with high-rise buildings and wide avenues, a bustling economy and rapid development, and masterful French planning and administration. The French urbanist Michel Écochard—director of the Service de l’Urbanisme, Casablanca's urban planning office at the time—featured prominently in the film, discussing how challenges such as internal migration and rapid urbanization were being handled in Casablanca. 

It was dubbed into English and Spanish.

References 

Propaganda films
Films shot in Morocco
Films set in Morocco
1952 short films
1952 films
Films set in Casablanca
Films set in the French colonial empire
French short films